Abu Dabis (also Romanized as Ābū Dabis) is a village in Kut-e Abdollah Rural District, in the Central District of Karun County, Khuzestan Province, Iran. At the 2006 census, its population was 1,475, in 294 families.

References 

Populated places in Karun County